Austrodomus is a genus of South African long-spinneret ground spider that was first described by R. F. Lawrence in 1947.

Species
 it contains four species, found only in South Africa:
 A. gamsberg
 A. oxoniensis
 A. scaber
 A. zuluensis

See also
 List of Prodidominae species

References

Endemic fauna of South Africa
Araneomorphae genera
Prodidominae